Donald Livingstone (1924 – 15 October 2001) was a South African mathematician and former Chair of Pure Mathematics at the University of Birmingham. Previously he was a professor at the University of Michigan. He was a member of the London Mathematical Society.

References 

South African mathematicians
1924 births
2001 deaths
University of Michigan faculty
Academics of the University of Birmingham